Munther Omar Abdul Aziz Abu Amarah is a Jordanian footballer who plays as a winger for Al-Wehdat and the Jordan national football team.

International career 
Abu Amarah's first international match with the Jordan national senior team was against Sudan on 14 December 2011, which resulted in a 0–0 draw, at Doha in the 2011 Pan Arab Games.

International goals

With U-22

With senior team 
Scores and results list Jordan's goal tally first.

International career statistics

References

External links 
 
 
 
 

Living people
Jordan international footballers
Al-Wehdat SC players
Jordanian Pro League players
Al-Nasr SC (Kuwait) players
Al-Fahaheel FC players
Jordanian expatriate sportspeople in Kuwait
Jordanian expatriate sportspeople in the United Arab Emirates
Jordanian people of Palestinian descent
1992 births
Jordanian footballers
Association football forwards
Jordanian expatriate footballers
Expatriate footballers in Kuwait
Expatriate footballers in the United Arab Emirates
2015 AFC Asian Cup players
UAE First Division League players
Khor Fakkan Sports Club players
Kuwait Premier League players